Andriy Mykhaylovych Bal (16 February 1958 – 9 August 2014) was a Soviet and Ukrainian professional footballer who played as a midfielder and football manager.

Club career
Born in Rozdil, Ukrainian SSR, Bal was a product of the Lviv youth football schools. By 1976 he was playing in the senior squad of Karpaty Lviv. After five years with the team, he earned a transfer to Dynamo Kyiv. He went on to spend the majority of his playing career with the team, winning four championship medals with them, as well as four Soviet Cups. He also picked up three runner-up medals. Another major achievement of his career with Dynamo Kyiv was winning the 1986 Cup Winners' Cup. In 1990, he left Dynamo to play in Israel with Maccabi Tel Aviv. He spent a season there before moving on to Bnei Yehuda, where he finished his playing career in 1993.

International career
Bal played for the USSR national team 20 times, and scored 1 goal., a 20-meter strike in the game against Brazil at the 1982 FIFA World Cup in Spain. He represented the team at all levels and won the 1976 U-19 UEFA Championship, the 1977 FIFA World Youth Championship, twice won the U-21 UEFA Championship (in 1980 and 1990). He also played in the 1986 FIFA World Cup, where the Soviet team reached the Round of 16, losing to Belgium in extra-time.

Coaching career
After retiring from playing Bal began coaching in Israel. His first coaching job was with Maccabi Haifa. From there he went on to coach Maccabi Herzliya and Hakoah Ramat Gan. In 2000, he returned to Ukraine to join the coaching staff of Dynamo Kyiv. In 2001, he became head-coach of Vorskla Poltava. After two seasons with them, he became Oleg Blokhin's assistant coach with the Ukraine national team. On 14 December 2007, he was officially announced as assistant-coach at FC Moscow, again moving there with Blokhin.

Personal life
His brother Orest Bal was also a professional footballer.

Death
Bal died on 9 August 2014 during a football match of veteran teams as a result of a blood clot.

Honours

As player
Dynamo Kyiv
 UEFA Cup Winners' Cup: 1986
 Soviet Top League: 1981, 1985, 1986, 1990
 Soviet Cup: 1982, 1985, 1987, 1990

Karpaty Lviv
 Soviet First League: 1979 

Bnei Yehuda
 Toto Cup: 1992

Soviet Union U21
 U-21 UEFA Championship: 1980, 1990

Soviet Union U20
 U-20 FIFA World Cup: 1977

Soviet Union U19
 U-19 UEFA Championship: 1976

As coach
Maccabi Haifa
 Israeli Championship: 1993–94

References

External links

RussiaTeam biography 
 

1958 births
2014 deaths
Sportspeople from Lviv Oblast
Lviv State University of Physical Culture alumni
Honoured Masters of Sport of the USSR
Recipients of the Order of Merit (Ukraine), 3rd class
Recipients of the Order of Merit (Ukraine), 2nd class
Soviet footballers
Ukrainian footballers
Soviet Union under-21 international footballers
Soviet Union international footballers
Association football midfielders
FC Karpaty Lviv players
FC Dynamo Kyiv players
Maccabi Tel Aviv F.C. players
Bnei Yehuda Tel Aviv F.C. players
Soviet Top League players
Soviet First League players
Liga Leumit players
Soviet expatriate footballers
Expatriate footballers in Israel
Soviet expatriate sportspeople in Israel
Ukrainian expatriate footballers
Ukrainian expatriate sportspeople in Israel
1982 FIFA World Cup players
1986 FIFA World Cup players
Ukrainian football managers
Maccabi Herzliya F.C. managers
Hakoah Ramat Gan F.C. managers
FC Vorskla Poltava managers
FC Chornomorets Odesa managers
Ukraine national football team managers
Liga Leumit managers
Ukrainian Premier League managers
Ukrainian expatriate football managers
Expatriate football managers in Israel
Expatriate football managers in Russia
Ukrainian expatriate sportspeople in Russia
Deaths from blood clot
Burials at Baikove Cemetery